Ben Finley is a broadcast journalist who is the Editorial Producer with “Anderson Cooper 360” which broadcasts on CNN. He was a Producer for “In the Life” on PBS and has produced for several MSNBC and CNN programs and specials, including Presidential debates, the wedding of William & Kate, Hurricane Sandy, PoliticsNation with Al Sharpton, “Hope Survives: 30 Years of AIDS” & “Bullying: It Stop’s Here.” He earned an Emmy Award and four Peabody awards. He is a graduate of New York Institute of Technology.

References

External links

Year of birth missing (living people)
Living people
New York Institute of Technology alumni
American film producers
Place of birth missing (living people)